The Tasmanian Government Railways K class was a class of 0-4-0+0-4-0 Garratt articulated steam locomotives operated by the Tasmanian Government Railways from 1909 – the first Garratt locomotives built.

Overview

Although considered the first Garratt locomotives, they did in fact differ in two important details from Herbert Garratt's original concept. First: they are compound locomotives, with two high-pressure cylinders on the rear engine, and a pipe leading to two larger low-pressure cylinders on the front engine; second: both sets of cylinders were placed facing each other inside their engine units, rather than facing out as in all other Garratts. This was a problem on the rare warm days on the West Coast Range in Tasmania, as one pair of cylinders was under the cab, making the cab uncomfortably hot.

The North East Dundas Tramway on which they worked traversed some of the most rugged terrain in the world served by a railway at the time. It featured long stretches of 1-in-25 grades, high trestle bridges and 30-metre-radius reverse curves.

After the line closed in 1929, the boiler of K1 was sold to a sawmill, and in 1947 K1 was sold to its builder Beyer, Peacock & Co, with the boiler and boiler cradle of K2 attached and repatriated back to England. Beyer, Peacock & Co closed in 1966. K1 was sold to the Ffestiniog Railway for 1500 GBP after an appeal for funds. However, it was too tall and wide for use within the restricted loading gauge, and after ten years of storage at Porthmadog, it was lent to the National Railway Museum (NRM), York where it was cosmetically restored.

As the Welsh Highland Railway (WHR) rebuilding project reached fruition, K1's potential for the line was recognised and in 1995 it left the NRM. A new boiler was found to be required. Parts were restored at various locations, with K1 reassembled at Boston Lodge. After conversion to oil-firing, it steamed again in 2004 and finally received HM Railway Inspectorate approval in September 2006 to haul trains. A conversion back to coal firing was completed in August 2007 together with some other work which allowed it to appear at the Superpower weekend in early September. It entered regular passenger service in October 2007.

In 2014, K1's boiler certificate expired and it was withdrawn for overhaul. A full boiler shell exam is required. However, because the locomotive does not meet the operational requirements of the WHR (it cannot haul the passenger loads required) and with the WHR's workshops fully committed to other overhaul projects, in 2019 it moved to the Statfold Barn Railway for a period of ten years. A boiler overhaul was started in January 2020 .

References

Further reading

Belibin, Bruce and McKillop, Bob - K1 steams again Light Railways, Number 193  February 2007  pp. 3–7

External links 

Garratt locomotives Rail Tasmania
TGR K class Drawing
Drawing of TGR K class

Beyer, Peacock locomotives
Compound locomotives
Garratt locomotives
Railway locomotives introduced in 1909
Steam locomotives of Tasmania
0-4-0+0-4-0 locomotives
2 ft gauge locomotives